Teniatyska  is a village in the administrative district of Gmina Lubycza Królewska, within Tomaszów Lubelski County, Lublin Voivodeship, in eastern Poland, close to the border with Ukraine. The village is located in the historical region Galicia.

References

Teniatyska